Leandra Medine Cohen (born December 20, 1988) is an American author, blogger, and humor writer best known for Man Repeller, an independent fashion and lifestyle website.

Early life and education
Medine was born on December 20, 1988 in Manhattan. Her father, Mois Medine, is of Turkish-Jewish descent, and her mother, Lyora "Laura" Medine, is of Iranian-Jewish descent. She grew up in an Orthodox Jewish household.

Medine attended the Ramaz School in Manhattan. She earned a bachelor's degree in journalism from the New School's Eugene Lang College in May 2011.

Career

Early career
Medine's first foray into online writing began in 2009, while a student at the New School. After studying abroad in Paris, Medine started a blog called Four Months in Paris using the hosting service Blogger. She later renamed it to Boogers and Bagels (stylized as Boogers + Bagels).

The blog primarily covered fashion trends, humor, personal stories, and feminist issues. Its final post was published on April 19, 2010, shortly after the launch of Medine's second, and better known, blog, the Man Repeller.

Man Repeller
Medine started the Man Repeller blog in May 2010 as a hobby. The idea for the blog came during a trip to Topshop with friend Rachel Strugatz, now an online editor at Women's Wear Daily. Medine recalled, "We were laughing at how everything was so man-repelling: acid-washed harem pants and enormous shoulder pads, and I just said, 'That's it! That's the blog.'"

A few days after it launched, the blog was featured on the fashion website Refinery29. It became popular enough that Medine began collaborating with major magazines like Lucky and Harper's Bazaar. The blog used a combination of traditional advertising, sponsored blog posts, appearance fees, and designer collaborations. Medine decided to work on the blog full-time after graduation.

In 2012, Medine Cohen was featured in Forbess "Top 30 Under 30" as one of the year's "most influential trendsetters," while Man Repeller was recognized in TIME's "25 Best Blogs of 2012", and received "Best Overall Blog" at the 2012 Bloglovin' Awards.

Initially, the blog was written solely by Medine, but later grew to include contributions from several writers and editors.  The blog also covered current events, lifestyle, and feminism. In September 2013 Grand Central Publishing published her book Man Repeller: Seeking Love. Finding Overalls.

Medine has collaborated with designers on limited collections of clothes and accessories, including Gryphon, shoe companies Del Toro and Superga, jewelry line Dannijo, and clothing line PJK. Additional brand collaborations include Michael Kors, Maje, BaubleBar, Stuart Weitzman, and Saks Fifth Avenue.

In 2012, Medine signed with the Creative Artists Agency, an entertainment talent agency headquartered in Los Angeles, California. In 2016, Medine launched MR by Man Repeller, a line of loafers, flats, metallic booties, and heels exclusive to Net-a-Porter. Later, Medine created her own shoe line Leandra Medine, which is sold at Barneys NY, Harvey Nichols, and The Webster.

On October 29, 2019, Medine launched her partnership collection with Mango.

Medine announced in June 2020 that she would “step back” her involvement in Man Repeller after allegations emerged that she had failed former staffers of color. In September 2020, the site was rebranded to Repeller, and Medine is still listed as the founder on the contributor page. On October 22, 2020, it was confirmed that Repeller would be shutting down due to financial constraints.

Publications 
Medine Cohen released her first book, an essay collection and memoir titled Man Repeller: Seeking Love, Finding Overalls, in 2013.

Personal life
In December 2011, Medine announced her engagement to Abie J. Cohen, a financial advisor at the Swiss investment bank UBS, whom she had met when she was 17 years old. Following the announcement, many responded negatively, questioning her commitment to the principles of “man repelling” outlined in her blog. The Huffington Post wrote: “What happens when the Man Repeller no longer repels men?” In her book, Medine outlined her doubts that followed the backlash to her engagement.

Medine and Cohen married in June 2012. They live in the East Village. In a ManRepeller article published in December 2016, Medine revealed she had suffered a miscarriage. In the December 16, 2016, episode of her podcast, she gave more details about the experience. On March 1, 2018, Medine gave birth to twin girls, Laura and Madeline.

References

External links
 The Man Repeller
 

1988 births
21st-century American essayists
21st-century American women writers
Fashion influencers
American fashion journalists
American humorists
21st-century American memoirists
American Orthodox Jews
American women bloggers
American bloggers
American women essayists
Eugene Lang College alumni
Jewish American writers
Mizrahi feminists
Living people
People from the Upper East Side
Ramaz School alumni
Writers from Manhattan
American women memoirists
Women humorists
People from the East Village, Manhattan
Shorty Award winners
American people of Iranian-Jewish descent
American people of Turkish-Jewish descent
21st-century American Jews